Birman, also called the "Sacred Cat of Burma", is a domestic cat breed.

Birman may also refer to

People with the surname
 Joan Birman, American topologist, specializing in braids and knot theory
 Joel Birman, Brazilian psychiatrist and psychotherapist
 Ken Birman, American computer scientist, specializing in resilient distributed systems
 Mikhail Shlyomovich Birman, Russian mathematician

Other uses
Birman, a 544-ton bargue chartered by the New Zealand Company
Burman University in Alberta, Canada

See also
Berman, a more common variant of the surname
Bierman, a similar surname
For the dominant ethnic group of Burma, see Bamar

he:בירמן (פירושונים)